The Hohe Warte is a mountain,  in height, in the Karwendel range in Austria. It is located between the  Kleiner Solstein to the west and the Hintere Brandjochspitze to the east, in the Nordkette in the state of Tyrol, north of the Innsbruck quarter of Kranebitten and has a prominence of at least 77 metres.

Access 
The Hohe Warte was first climbed in 1870 by Hermann von Barth. The present normal route to the top runs from the Aspach Hut above Innsbruck and poses no great difficulties. It runs through schrofen terrain up to the Gamswart Saddle, then for a short way along the western ridge to the summit. Another ascent runs up the south ridge and has a climbing grade of UIAA IV. Crossings to the Kleiner Solstein and Hintere Brandjochspitze are possible at grade III-.

Literature and maps 

Alpine Club map 1:25,000, Sheet 5/1, Karwendelgebirge West

References 

Two-thousanders of Austria
Karwendel
Mountains of Tyrol (state)
Mountains of the Alps
Innsbruck